Labiostrombus is a monospecific genus of sea snails, marine gastropod mollusks in the family Strombidae, the true conchs.

Species
Species within the genus Labiostrombus include:
Labiostrombus epidromis (Linnaeus, 1758) : common name : the Swan Conch; this species occurs in the Pacific Ocean along the Ryukyus (Japan), New Caledonia and Queensland, Australia. The shell size varies between 50 mm and 95 mm.

References

External links
 

Strombidae